The exchange-traded funds available on exchanges vary from country to country.  Many of the ETFs listed below are available exclusively on that nation's primary stock exchange and cannot be purchased on a foreign stock exchange.

List of American exchange-traded funds
List of Australian exchange-traded funds
List of Canadian exchange-traded funds
List of European exchange-traded funds
List of Hong Kong exchange-traded funds
List of Indian exchange-traded funds
List of Indonesian exchange-traded funds
List of Japanese exchange-traded funds
List of New Zealand exchange-traded funds
List of Singaporean exchange-traded funds
List of South African exchange-traded funds
List of South Korean exchange-traded funds
List of Taiwan exchange-traded funds
List of Turkish exchange-traded funds

See also

 Exchange-traded fund
 Exchange-traded product
 List of hedge funds
 List of private-equity firms
 List of investment banks
 Boutique investment bank
 Fund of funds
 Boutique investment bank
 Open-end fund
 Sovereign wealth fund